Harold Collins (1892–10 August 1918) was an Australian rules footballer who played with Fitzroy in the Victorian Football League.

Family
His brothers, Goldie and Norm both played for Fitzroy.

Military service
Collins was awarded the Distinguished Conduct Medal for bravery, before being killed in action on 10 August 1918 in World War I.

See also
 List of Victorian Football League players who died in active service

Footnotes

References
 World War One Service Record: Lieutenant Harold Collins, National Archives of Australia.
 Roll of Honour: Lieutenant Harold Collins, Australian War Memorial.
 Main, J. & Allen, D., "Collins, Harold DCM", pp.37-38 in Main, J. & Allen, D., Fallen – The Ultimate Heroes: Footballers Who Never Returned From War, Crown Content, (Melbourne), 2002.
 Holmesby, Russell & Main, Jim (2007). The Encyclopedia of AFL Footballers. 7th ed. Melbourne: Bas Publishing.

External links

1892 births
1918 deaths
Australian rules footballers from Melbourne
Fitzroy Football Club players
Australian military personnel killed in World War I
Australian recipients of the Distinguished Conduct Medal
People from Fitzroy, Victoria
Military personnel from Melbourne